Frederick Byron may refer to:
 Frederick Byron (cricketer), English cricketer and barrister
 Frederick George Byron, English amateur artist and caricaturist
 Frederick Byron, 10th Baron Byron, Anglican clergyman, peer and politician